Albert Margai (born 19 September 1987) is an English professional basketball player who currently plays for the Bradford Dragons of the English Basketball League.

References

External links
REAL GM Profile
Eurobasket.com Profile
Albert Margai Highlights - 2010/2011 - Youtube.com video

1987 births
Living people
Basketball players from Greater London
English men's basketball players
Point guards
Margai family (Sierra Leone)
Mende people